History of Saudi Arabia & Wahabism (2014) is an English-Language book translated by Anwar Haroon. The origin of this book is an Urdu-Language book “Tareekh Najad-o-Hijaz” witten by Mufti Abdul Qayyum Qadri Hazarvi (died 2003) from Pakistan. However this English version has been published from United States of America.

Style
Anwar Haroon has painted the Wahhabism as Terrorism in his preface, actually he played a role of a critic of Saudi Arabia & Wahhabism. He writes in preface, on Wahabis:
Now they have changed their title from Wahabis to Ahl e Hadeeth and now as Salafis, they are given generous aid from Saudi Arabia and other Middle East countries and they are misguiding the young generation of the Muslims around the world and mass killing in the name of jihad is ongoing by Al Qaida, Taliban and many others.    l got serious in finding out the cause of this bloody change and I happened to read the book “Tareekh Najad-o-Hijaz” written in Urdu language. The book also gives the details about Wahabisim, so it is named as “History of Saudi Arabia and Wahabisim. Further I have added photographs and illustrations of concerned people, historical places and mosques in this regard.

References

History books about Islam
History books about Saudi Arabia